

History 

Navrongo Senior High School is a school in Navrongo which was established in September 1960 by Ghana's first president Osagyefo Dr. Kwame Nkrumah. It was named President's College. The president indicated his dream that this school will become a great centre of learning in the north and that he will watch its progress with keen interest. Later, it was simply called Navrongo School (NAVASCO). Its mascot is the horn, an important northern Ghanaian symbol of royalty, bravery, and leadership. The school's motto is "LUX BOREALIS" in Latin. It means "The Light of the North". Old students are known as NABIA, a local word meaning Citizen.

Facilities 
NAVASCO is one of few schools in northern Ghana with a wealth of physical infrastructure, a major reason for its ability to educate many people. It is the oldest and prestigious secondary school in the Upper East Region and among about eight elite schools in northern Ghana. In the 1970s, it became known for its agricultural activities under Mr. MacDonald, a veteran British educator. The school has a dam for irrigation farming and an orchard some few metres from the chapel. The school is blessed with hectares of farmlands that affords almost all Teaching and non-Teaching staffs with farming opportunities. There is the Kasadjan Sports Stadium for recreation. The famous MacDonald Hall serves assembly and entertainment purposes. The school library served the school and the community for years. A workshop also ensures that not much is bought from outside of school. Carpentry and metal works for all things on campus are carried out in this workshop. There were fourteen residential halls for students as at 2015. They are Kwegyir Aggrey, John F. Kennedy, Livingtone, Abatey, Ferguson, Garvey, Guggisberg, Nkrumah, Volta, and Abavana halls all for gentlemen. Slessor, Tono, Independence, and Luther King halls served ladies.

Academics 
The school offers programmes in Agricultural Science, General Science, General Business, General Arts, and Visual Arts and Home Economics. Students have numerous options to choose from in these general programmes. There is a well equipped Science Laboratory and the School Farm both of which offer practical training to science students. The Debating Society is open to all students but is practically dominated by General Arts students who use it as a public speaking training ground. It has produced many of the famed politicians who graduated from this school.

Students 
This is a highly selective school which remains a top choice for students in the north and throughout the country. This is mainly attributable to the high academic standards, student culture and connections, pedigree, and discipline. Student numbers have increased over the years. It uses a unique numbering system called Folios. No two students have the same number. Old students immediately identify themselves with their numbers. This numbering system allows them to know who went to Navasco earlier. The school has a strong old students presence in the UK, North America and East Asia. NAVASCO is today headed by Madam Mercy Babachuweh.

Leadership 
The first headmaster was J.K Fiegbor. He was followed by Agyemang Dickson, Crawford, and then Mr. C.G MacDonald, probably the famous headmaster in the school's history. He used students to construct MacDonald Hall, the assembly place for students. Under him, the teaching of Mathematics so improved that it became a source of attraction for many talented students who wanted to better their Maths for progress into higher education. Mr. Adenze Kangah and Mr. Alosius Alexis Abem were also two well-known headmasters of the school in the 1980s before Madam Katumi assumed responsibility in the 1990s. She was instrumental in strengthening discipline and improving performance. Mr. Patrick Tangonyire took over in the 2000s.

Notable alumni 
The school educated many of the north's elite. Others come from the southern parts of Ghana. Notable among its old students are

 Hawa Yakubu  
 Cletus Avoka  
 John Ndebugre
 Martin Amidu  
 Haruna Iddrisu  
 Ambrose Dery  
 Dr Francis Ali-Osman 
Michael Samson-Oje
Henry Ford Kamel 
Prof. Albert Abane
Roland Agambire  
Samuel Marful-Sau  
 Amin Alhassan
among many others. Many other old students came from other African countries.

References 

Schools in Ghana
Upper East Region
Educational institutions established in 1960
1960 establishments in Ghana